The HP Pavilion dv4 is a model series of laptops manufactured by Hewlett-Packard Company that features a 14.1" diagonal display. The HP Pavilion dv5 features a 15.4" and the HP Pavilion dv7 a 17" display.

Models
dv4se (Special Edition) - Features the Midnight Wave finish
dv4-1502yu- Uses An Intel Processor
dv4z - Uses An AMD Processor

Weight And Dimensions

Note: Weight varies by configuration

Customizable Features
The following are customizable features only available in the United States (HP CTO Notebooks). Information retrieved on the HP store website, November 2008.

References

Pavilion dv4